Jean Bosco Baremes (born August 30, 1960 in Han, Carteret Islands, Papua New Guinea) is a Papua New Guinean clergyman and bishop for the Roman Catholic Diocese of Port-Vila. He was appointed bishop in 2009.

See also
 Catholic Church in Vanuatu
 History of Papua New Guinea

References

Papua New Guinean Roman Catholic bishops
Roman Catholic bishops of Port-Vila
Living people
1960 births